Akro Senior High Technical School (also known as ASHTECH) is a public school located in the Odumase-Krobo in the Lower Manya Krobo Municipality in the Eastern region of Ghana.

References 

1991 establishments in Ghana
Education in the Eastern Region (Ghana)
High schools in Ghana
Public schools in Ghana